Mukesh Kumar Ahlawat is an Indian politician and is member of the Seventh Legislative Assembly of Delhi. He is a member of the Aam Aadmi Party and represents Sultan Pur Majra (Assembly constituency) of Delhi. He won the election by 48,042 votes, replacing Sandeep Kumar former minister for the welfare of Scheduled castes. Mukesh considers himself a businessman.

Electoral performance

References 
 

Living people
Delhi MLAs 2020–2025
Aam Aadmi Party MLAs from Delhi
Year of birth missing (living people)